Nashtarud (also Romanized as Nashtārūd, Nashtā Rūd, Neshtā Rūd, and Nashtarood) is a city and capital of Nashta District, Tonekabon County, Mazandaran Province, Iran.  At the 2006 census, its population was 5,837, in 1,710 families.

References

Populated places in Tonekabon County
Cities in Mazandaran Province